Rod Underwood (born in New Orleans, United States) is an American former soccer player and currently head coach and sporting director for Chattanooga FC in the National Independent Soccer Association.

Playing career
Underwood began playing soccer at the college level with Furman University in 1985. He became the first African American to play soccer at Furman University. While at Furman he was the leading goal scorer, a three-time all-conference selection, and the conference tournament MVP as a senior. In his final year at Furman Underwood earned his Bachelor's Degree in 1989. As a player Underwood spent time with New Mexico Chiles, Albuquerque Geckos, and New Orleans Gamblers.

Management career
Underwood first began his coaching career as player-coach at New Mexico Chiles in 1994. Once he moved to Albuquerque in 1997, he led the Geckos to the USISL D-3 Pro League Championship before coaching the club through its promotion to the A-League a season later. The following season Underwood was appointed the head coach for the South Carolina Shamrocks in 1999. Following his stint with South Carolina, he was appointed the assistant coach for Georgia State University. On April 19, 2007 Portland Timbers head coach Gavin Wilkinson appointed Underwood as his assistant coach. During the 2007 USL season he helped the Timbers finish second place in the standings, and help the club reach the semifinals in the playoffs before losing to Atlanta Silverbacks. On February 5, 2009 the Cleveland City Stars announced the hiring of Underwood to serve as the new head coach for the 2009 USL season. He became the second head coach in club history, after succeeding Martin Rennie. In preparation for the 2009 season Underwood resolved to bring new players to the squad, notably players from Africa and MLS experienced players. Underwood was named head coach for North East Stars in the TT Pro League on April 16, 2010. In 2010, he joined the coaching team for the MLS side the Portland Timbers as an assistant coach for the U-16 academy team.

In 2012, he went abroad to manage Mount Aureol in the Sierra Leone National First Division. He later returned to the United States and joined the management staff of Sacramento Republic FC in the United Soccer League in the capacity of an assistant coach. In 2017, he was named the head coach for Montego Bay United F.C. in the National Premier League. In 2019, he was appointed the director of club relations for iSoccerPath.

On March 3, 2021, Underwood was announced as the new head coach of National Independent Soccer Association side Stumptown AC ahead of the team's return from hiatus. On December 3, 2021, Underwood was named head coach of Chattanooga FC.

References

External links
Rod Underwood - Head Coach profile

1968 births
Living people
American soccer coaches
American soccer players
Association football midfielders
Albuquerque Geckos players
New Orleans Gamblers players
New Mexico Chiles (USISL) players
Sportspeople from New Orleans
USISL players
Cleveland City Stars coaches
TT Pro League managers
Portland Timbers non-playing staff
USL Second Division players
South Carolina Shamrocks players
North East Stars F.C. managers
National Independent Soccer Association coaches
Furman Paladins men's soccer players
Soccer players from Louisiana
Georgia State Panthers men's soccer
American expatriate soccer coaches
Expatriate football managers in Jamaica
Expatriate football managers in Trinidad and Tobago
Expatriate football managers in Sierra Leone
American expatriate sportspeople in Jamaica
American expatriate sportspeople in Trinidad and Tobago
American expatriates in Sierra Leone
Association football player-managers